In Fast Company may refer to:
 In Fast Company (1946 film), a film starring The Bowery Boys
 In Fast Company (1924 film), an American silent action film

See also
 Fast Company (disambiguation)